Cao Haiqing (Chinese: 曹海清; born 28 September 1993 in Wuhan) is a Chinese footballer who plays for Cangzhou Mighty Lions in the Chinese Super League.

Club career
Cao Haiqing started his professional football career in 2011 when he was loaned to Wenzhou Provenza's squad for the 2011 China League Two campaign. He was promoted to Hangzhou Greentown first team squad in 2012 by Takeshi Okada. He made his Super League debut on 27 May 2012 against Henan Jianye, coming on as a substitute for Kim Dong-jin in the 70th minute. Cao became a regular starter in the 2016 season under Hong Myung-bo.

On 28 February 2017, Cao transferred to fellow Super League side Jiangsu Suning after Hangzhou was relegated to the second tier. On 2 April 2017, he made his debut for the club in a 3–1 away defeat against Liaoning FC, coming on for Yang Xiaotian in the 87th minute. He would struggle to become a regular within the team and go on loan to second tier football club Kunshan for the 2020 China League One campaign. The following season he would transfer to another China League One club in Nanjing City on 15 April 2021.

Career statistics 
Statistics accurate as of match played 31 December 2021.

References

External links
 

1993 births
Living people
Footballers from Wuhan
Zhejiang Professional F.C. players
Jiangsu F.C. players
Kunshan F.C. players
China League Two players
China League One players
Chinese Super League players
Footballers at the 2014 Asian Games
Association football defenders
Chinese footballers
Asian Games competitors for China